Kicaster is an unincorporated community in northwestern Wilson County, Texas, United States.

Bibliography
"Texas Centennial, History of Wilson County, Wilson County Centennial Committee.
"The Good Old Days: a history of LaVernia" by the Civic Government class of LaVernia High School, 1936–1937 school year."
"Wilson County Centennial 1860-1960"  By the Wilson county library, Centennial program handed out at The 100yr centennial celebration."

External links
Handbook of Texas Online: Kicaster Creek

Kicaster

Unincorporated communities in Texas
Unincorporated communities in Wilson County, Texas
Greater San Antonio
Ghost towns in Central Texas